The Aero L-60 Brigadýr was a small, high-wing propeller-driven Czechoslovakian STOL utility aircraft developed for both civil and military use. A prototype, designated XL-60, with Argus As 10C engine, first flew on December 24, 1953, but it was not successful. The plane was thoroughly redesigned and the second improved prototype, with M-208B flat-six engine, flew on June 8, 1954. The aircraft's configuration bears a strong resemblance to the Fieseler Fi 156 "Storch" licence-produced in Czechoslovakia during and after World War II (as K-65 Čáp), and which this aircraft was intended to replace. By the end of production in 1960, 273 had been built by Aero, including an improved version, the L-160 with an all-metal tail.

Aircraft retrofitted with a PZL-built Ivchenko AI-14R radial engine are known as the L-60S.

Variants
 XL-60 : Prototype.
 L-60 : Single-engined light utility transport, observation aircraft.
 L-60A : 50 production aircraft for the Czech Air Force. Also known as the K-60. Armed with MG-15 7.92 mm machine gun in a rear cab. First flew on June 24, 1955.
 L-60B : Agricultural crop spraying aircraft (300 L chemicals tank).
 L-60D : Glider tug aircraft.
 L-60E :Air ambulance aircraft.
 L-60F : Glider tug aircraft.
 L-60S : Aircraft fitted with the PZL-built 260-hp Ivchenko AI-14R radial piston engine.
 L-60SF : Fitted with the M-462RF radial piston engine.
 L-160 : Improved version with all-metal tail.

Operators

Civil operators

 Slov-Air

 MÉM Flight Service used 2 L-60 (registered: HA-BRA, HA-BRB) from 1959 for short period.

 Polish Air Ambulance Service used 3 L-60F in 1957–1974

Sri Lanka

Military operators

 Czechoslovakian Air Force

 East German Air Force

Specifications (L-60)

See also

References
Notes

Bibliography
 Taylor, John W. R. Jane's All The World's Aircraft 1961–62. London: Sampson Low, Marston & Company, 1961.

External links

 Specs & Photo at Flugzeuginfo.net
 Aero L‑60 Brigadýr article at AirHistory.net

L-60
1950s Czechoslovakian civil utility aircraft
1950s Czechoslovakian military utility aircraft
Glider tugs
Single-engined tractor aircraft
High-wing aircraft
Aircraft first flown in 1953